L. Stewart Hinckley (November 23, 1902 – May 8, 1969) served as a member of the California State Assembly from the 73rd district. He was a Republican.  During World War II he served in the United States Army.

Hinckley was born November 23, 1902, in Bryn Mawr, California. He died when the small plane he and his wife were flying near Page, Arizona, crashed on May 8, 1969.

References

United States Army personnel of World War II
1902 births
1969 deaths
20th-century American politicians
Victims of aviation accidents or incidents in 1969
Victims of aviation accidents or incidents in the United States
Republican Party members of the California State Assembly